Constantin Movilă (1594 – July 1612) is the Prince of Moldavia from 1607 to 1611. The son of Prince Ieremia Movilă and driven by his mother, the ambitious  Erszébet Csomortany de Losoncz, he twice seized the Moldovan throne at the expense of his cousin Mihai Movilă, son of Simion I Movilă in 1607.

In 1610 he welcomed Prince Radu X Șerban of Wallachia who was exiled. The following year he was dethroned by Ștefan Tomșa, the second son of the ephemeral prince of Moldova, Ștefan VII Tomșa.

As a refugee in Poland, he attempted to regain the throne leading an army assembled by his Polish brothers-in-law. Defeated at the Battle of Cornul lui Sas, he had to pass the Dniester river again, but once on the left side of the bank, he was captured by the Tatars. He escaped  but then drowned in the river in July 1612 at the age of about 17

References

Sources 
 Alexandru Dimitrie Xenopol Histoire des Roumains de la Dacie trajane : Depuis les origines jusqu'à l'union des principautés. E Leroux Paris (1896)
 Nicolas Iorga Histoire des Roumains et de la romanité orientale. (1920)
  Constantin C. Giurescu & Dinu C. Giurescu, Istoria Românilor Volume III (depuis 1606), Editura Științifică și Enciclopedică, București, 1977.
 Jean Nouzille La Moldavie, Histoire tragique d'une région européenne, Ed. Bieler, .
 Gilles Veinstein, Les Ottomans et la mort   (1996)  .
 Joëlle Dalegre Grecs et Ottomans 1453-1923. De la chute de Constantinople à la fin de l'Empire Ottoman, L'Harmattan Paris (2002)  .

Rulers of Moldavia
1594 births
1612 deaths
People from the Ottoman Empire